Johan Hagivang (also Juhan Haagivang; 20 January 1878 Palometsa, Kasaritsa Parish (now Võru Parish), Kreis Werro – 30 November 1942 Sevurallag, Sverdlovsk Oblast) was an Estonian politician. He was a member of the IV Riigikogu, representing the Farmers' Assemblies.

References

1878 births
1942 deaths
People from Võru Parish
People from Kreis Werro
Farmers' Assemblies politicians
Members of the Riigikogu, 1929–1932
Members of the Estonian National Assembly
Members of the Riiginõukogu
Russian military personnel of World War I
Estonian people executed by the Soviet Union